The Henou was a French automobile manufactured only in 1923.  Marketed by M. Henou from Paris, they were 1843 cc cars built by Guilick of Maubeuge.

References
David Burgess Wise, The New Illustrated Encyclopedia of Automobiles

Defunct motor vehicle manufacturers of France